Erasmus Darwin Leavitt Jr. (October 27, 1836 – March 11, 1916), also known as E. D. Leavitt, was a noted American mechanical engineer best known for his steam engine designs.

Life and work 
Leavitt was born in Lowell, Massachusetts to Erasmus Darwin Leavitt Sr., a native of Cornish, New Hampshire, and Almina (Fay) Leavitt. He graduated from local schools at age 16, and performed a 3-year apprenticeship at the Lowell Manufacturing Company.

After his apprenticeship Leavitt worked for one year at the engineering firm of Corliss & Nightingale in Providence, Rhode Island before returning to Boston, where he became assistant foreman for Harrison Loring. In this role he designed the steam engine for the USS Hartford. From 1859–61 he again worked in Providence, this time as chief draftsman for Thurston, Gardner & Company, builders of steam engines.

During the Civil War, Leavitt first served aboard the USS Sagamore, then in construction roles in Baltimore, Boston, and Brooklyn, and ultimately as an instructor in steam engineering at the United States Naval Academy. In 1867 he resigned his teaching post to become a consulting engineer.

Leavitt was a member of the American Academy of Arts and Sciences, and a founding member of the American Society of Mechanical Engineers, for which he served as vice president from 1881 to 1882, and president in 1883. In 1884 he received the first honorary doctorate of engineering degree granted by the Stevens Institute of Technology.

Leavitt was a resident of Cambridge, Massachusetts. He and his wife, the former Elizabeth Pettit, daughter of Philadelphia locomotive designer William Pettit, had five children: Mary Alford; Hart Hooker; Margaret Almira; Harriet Sherman; and Annie Louise. The astronomer Henrietta Swan Leavitt was his niece.

Work 

Leavitt  first achieved professional prominence in 1873 for his design of a novel pumping engine. From 1874–1904 he served as consulting engineer for the Calumet and Hecla Mining Company, where he designed more than 40 types of engines for a variety of uses for the company's Michigan mines. Each huge stationary steam engine was named, much like a steam locomotive or ship, with names including the Arcadia, Chippewa, Frontenac, Mackinac, Marquette, and Superior.

He also designed steam-powered water pumps for various municipal water systems, including those of Louisville, Kentucky and Boston, and the power source for a hydraulic forge at the Bethlehem Steel Company.

Patents 
 US 129240 A, Improvement in steam pumping-engines, 1872 
 US 283261 A, Signor to dauphin, 1883
 US 380330 A, Pump, 1887-88
 US 402256 A, Steam-cylinder for steam-engines, 1888-89
 US 402257 A, Hoisting-engine, 1888-89

Further reading 
 Carol Poh Miller, Landmarks in Mechanical Engineering, Purdue University Press, pages 16–17. .

References

External links 

 Erasmus Darwin Leavitt Jr, ASME

1836 births
1916 deaths
Leavitt family
Presidents of the American Society of Mechanical Engineers
American mechanical engineers
Calumet and Hecla Mining Company personnel
People from Lowell, Massachusetts
People from Cambridge, Massachusetts
Fellows of the American Academy of Arts and Sciences
19th-century American engineers
20th-century American engineers